1997–98 Croatian First A League was the seventh season of the Croatian handball league since its independence.

League table

References

External links
EHF
Croatian Handball Federation

1997-98
handball
handball
1997–98 domestic handball leagues